Trevor Deshea Townsend (born September 8, 1975) is an American football coach and former cornerback who is the passing game coordinator and cornerbacks coach for the Jacksonville Jaguars of the National Football League (NFL). He  previously served as an assistant coach for the Chicago Bears, New York Giants, Tennessee Titans and Arizona Cardinals.

Townsend played college football for the Alabama Crimson Tide and was selected by the Pittsburgh Steelers in the fourth round (117th overall) in the 1998 NFL Draft, where he spent his entire career, besides his final year with the Indianapolis Colts.

Early years
A native of Batesville, Mississippi, Townsend played high school football for the South Panola Tigers, where he was the teammate of fellow future Alabama Crimson Tide star Dwayne Rudd. Townsend played quarterback at South Panola and led the team to the 1993 Mississippi State 5A championship and an undefeated 15–0 record.

Playing career

College
Along with Rudd, Townsend continued his career in college at the University of Alabama where both became members of the Theta Delta Chapter of the Phi Beta Sigma fraternity, in 1995. He majored in business management.

He had seven career interceptions at Alabama. In 1995 at Georgia, Townsend returned a blocked field goal attempt 90 yards for a touchdown in a 31-0 win.

Townsend was named All-SEC in 1995, 1996, and 1997.

National Football League

Pittsburgh Steelers
The Pittsburgh Steelers selected Townsend in the fourth round (117th overall) of the 1998 NFL Draft. He was the 14th cornerback drafted in 1998.

Townsend grew from a special teams player and nickelback (and initially known in Pittsburgh as the first player to wear Rod Woodson's number 26 after left the Steelers), into a solid starter for the Pittsburgh Steelers at cornerback. Townsend was known for his outside speed as a pass rusher. Townsend has recorded 322 tackles, 15.5 quarterback sacks and 18 interceptions during his twelve years as a Steeler. He also had a key sack on Seattle quarterback Matt Hasselbeck during the final minutes of Super Bowl XL, which helped secure the Steelers eventual victory.

On March 23, 2002, the Pittsburgh Steelers signed Townsend to a four-year, $4.20 million contract as an unrestricted free agent that included a signing bonus of $1 million. He visited with the Tampa Bay Buccaneers during free agency and his agent was also contacted by the New England Patriots, Houston Texans, and Atlanta Falcons.

On March 17, 2006, the Pittsburgh Steelers signed Townsend to a four-year, $8 million contract that included a signing bonus of $2 million. He received the contract offer during a visit with the New England Patriots.

During the 2008 season, Townsend accepted the reduced role from starting cornerback to the nickel package.

Indianapolis Colts
In August 2010, Townsend joined the Indianapolis Colts. On November 9, 2010, he was waived by the Colts. For the season, Townsend played in eight Colts games with no starts, and totaled 10 tackles and no interceptions or sacks.

Coaching career

Arizona Cardinals
On February 10, 2011, Townsend was hired as assistant defensive backs coach of the Arizona Cardinals, joining former coach Ray Horton who was named defensive coordinator. In the 2011 NFL draft, the Cardinals selected cornerback Patrick Peterson with the 5th pick. The Cardinals would go 8-8 and miss the playoffs for the second straight year. During the season they would the defeat the would-be NFC West champion San Francisco 49ers 21-19. Under his coaching, safety Adrian Wilson would be named PFF's second-team All-Pro and would be selected to the Pro Bowl.

In the 2012 NFL draft, the Cardinals selected cornerback Jamell Fleming and safety Justin Bethel with the 80th and 177th picks respectively. The Cardinals would go 5-11 and miss the playoffs for the third straight year. During the season, they would defeat two playoff teams, the AFC East champion New England Patriots & the Seattle Seahawks. Under his coaching, Patrick Peterson would lead the NFL in fumble recoveries and finish 4th in interceptions, defensive back James Sanders would lead the NFL in fumble return yards & defensive back Greg Toler would record the longest interception return of the year with 102 yards. Patrick Peterson would be named to the Pro Bowl. He would be released alongside head coach Ken Whisenhunt at the end of the season.

Mississippi State
In January 2013, Townsend was hired as cornerbacks coach at Mississippi State University. The Bulldogs would go 7-6 and would win the Liberty Bowl, defeating Rice 44-7. They would lose to all of their ranked opponents, No. 13 Oklahoma State, No. 10 LSU, No. 14 South Carolina, No. 11 Texas A&M, and No. 1 Alabama. Under his coaching, defensive back Nickoe Whitley recorded 5 interceptions, 2nd-best in the SEC, Jamerson Love ranked 2nd in interception return touchdowns, and Taveze Calhoun ranked 2nd in interception return yards. Whitley would be named All-SEC.

In 2014, the Bulldogs ended the season ranked No. 11, going 10-3 and would lose the Orange Bowl to No. 10 Georgia Tech 34-49. They would win 3 of their five ranked matchups, defeating No. 8 LSU, No. 6 Texas A&M, and No. 2 Auburn, but falling to No. 4 Alabama & No. 18 Ole Miss.

In 2015, the Bulldogs went 9-4 and would win the Belk Bowl, defeating NC State 51-28. They would lose all of their ranked matchups, No. 14 LSU, No. 14 Texas A&M, No. 3 Alabama, and No. 19 Ole Miss.

Tennessee Titans
On January 26, 2016, Townsend was named the defensive backs coach of the Tennessee Titans, joining his former defensive coordinator when he was a player, Dick LeBeau from the Steelers during 2004-09. In the 2016 NFL Draft, the Titans took safety Kevin Byard in the third round (64th pick). In 2016, the Titans went 9-7 but missed the playoffs for the eighth straight season. During the season, the Titans would defeat four playoff teams, the NFC North champion Green Bay Packers, the AFC West Kansas City Chiefs, the Miami Dolphins & the Detroit Lions.

In 2017, the Titans went 9-7 but made the playoffs for the first time since 2008. They would beat the Kansas City Chiefs 22-21 in the Wild Card round, winning their first playoff game since 2003. They would lose to the New England Patriots 14-35 in the Divisional Round. Under his coaching, safety Kevin Byard would lead the NFL in interceptions, make the 2018 Pro Bowl, and was named first-team All-Pro.

New York Giants
On February 6, 2018, Townsend was named the assistant defensive backs coach for the New York Giants. During 2018, the Giants went 5-11 for the first time since 1995 and missed the playoffs for the second straight season. They would defeat two playoff teams, the AFC South champion Houston Texans & the NFC North champion Chicago Bears. Under his coaching, cornerback Janoris Jenkins ranked 5th in passes defended and safety Landon Collins made the Pro Bowl.

Chicago Bears
On January 18, 2019, Townsend was named the defensive backs coach for the Chicago Bears, a position that was eventually renamed to secondary coach. The Bears went 8-8 in 2019 and missed the playoffs. Under his coaching, Kyle Fuller made the Pro Bowl.

Jacksonville Jaguars
On February 17, 2022, Townsend was hired by the Jacksonville Jaguars as their passing game coordinator and cornerbacks coach under head coach Doug Pederson.

References

External links
Jacksonville Jaguars profile
ESPN.com Deshea Townsend player card
The Deshea Townsend Show on KDKA/CW

1975 births
Living people
Alabama Crimson Tide football players
American football cornerbacks
Arizona Cardinals coaches
Chicago Bears coaches
Indianapolis Colts players
Jacksonville Jaguars coaches
Mississippi State Bulldogs football coaches
New York Giants coaches
People from Batesville, Mississippi
Pittsburgh Steelers players
Players of American football from Mississippi
Tennessee Titans coaches
African-American coaches of American football
African-American players of American football
21st-century African-American sportspeople
20th-century African-American sportspeople